Amit Gershon (born December 5, 1995) is an Israeli professional basketball player for Hapoel Eilat of the Israeli Basketball Premier League. He was named the Israeli League Rising Star in 2019.

Early life
Gershon was born in Hadera, Israel. He played for Maccabi Hadera and Hapoel Emek Yizra'el youth teams.

Professional career

Hapoel Afula (2014–2017)
In 2014, Gershon started his professional career with Hapoel Afula of the Israeli National League. He played three seasons with Afula, averaging 9.4 points, 2.8 assists and 2.7 rebounds per game while shooting 40.9 percent from three-point range in his last season with the team.

Hapoel Be'er Sheva (2017–2019)
On July 2, 2017, Gershon signed with Hapoel Be'er Sheva, signing a two-year deal. In 37 games played during the 2017–18 season, he averaged 8.9 points and 2.4 rebounds per game, while shooting 40.7 percent from three-point range. Gershon helped Be'er Sheva win the Israeli National League championship, earning a promotion to the Premier League for the first time in their history.

On May 15, 2019, Gershon recorded a career-high 32 points, shooting 9-of-12 from three-point range, along with four rebounds and four assists for 37 PIR, leading Be'er Sheva to a 104–77 win over Hapoel Gilboa Galil. He was subsequently named Israeli League Round 32 MVP. On June 7, 2019, Gershon was named the Israeli League Rising Star.

Hapoel Gilboa Galil (2019–2021)
On June 25, 2019, Gershon signed with Hapoel Gilboa Galil for the 2019–20 season.

Hapoel Jerusalem (2021–2022)
On July 26, 2021, Gershon signed with Hapoel Jerusalem.

Hapoel Eilat (2022–present)
On July 25, 2022, he has signed with Hapoel Eilat of the Israeli Basketball Premier League.

National team career
Gershon was a member of the U-20 Israeli national team in the 2015 FIBA Europe Under-20 Championship. He also participated in the 2017 Summer Universiade.

References

External links 
 RealGM profile
 Basket.co.il profile

1995 births
Living people
Hapoel Afula players
Hapoel Be'er Sheva B.C. players
Hapoel Eilat basketball players
Hapoel Gilboa Galil Elyon players
Hapoel Jerusalem B.C. players
Israeli Basketball Premier League players
Israeli men's basketball players
People from Hadera
Shooting guards